Songs from the Black Hole is a cover album by American metal band Prong, released on March 31, 2015. According to frontman Tommy Victor, the goal of the cover album was to explore musical roots of the band and "the vast landscape that makes up the band's sound". He stated, it should visualize "the theme of urban decay, desolation, insecurity and ultimate change".

The basic tracks were recorded with Peter Funke in Trixx Studios in Berlin, Germany. The album was mixed and mastered by Chris Collier at Mission:Black Studios in Santa Clarita, California, with additional guitars also recorded there. Vocals were recorded by Collier at Lynchbox Studios also in Santa Clarita. Jason Christopher added background vocals on "Give Me the Cure". The cover artwork was created by Mike Lopez.

Reception

Songs from the Black Hole received mixed reviews from critics. On Metacritic, the album holds a score of 66/100 based on four reviews, indicating "generally favorable reviews".

Track listing 
 "Doomsday" (Discharge) - 2:44
 "Vision Thing"  (The Sisters of Mercy) - 4:44
 "Goofy's Concern" (Butthole Surfers) - 2:44
 "Kids of the Black Hole" (Adolescents) - 5:28
 "The Bars" (Black Flag) - 4:18
 "Seeing Red" (Killing Joke) - 6:18
 "Don't Want to Know If You Are Lonely" (Hüsker Dü) - 3:32
 "Give Me the Cure" (Fugazi) - 3:08
 "Banned in D.C." (Bad Brains) - 2:22
 "Cortez the Killer" (Neil Young) - 6:52

Personnel
Tommy Victor – guitars, vocals
Jason Christopher – bass, additional vocals on "Give Me the Cure"
Art Cruz – drums

References 

2015 albums
Prong (band) albums
Albums produced by Tommy Victor
Covers albums